This article lists the critical exponents of the ferromagnetic transition in the Ising model. In statistical physics, the Ising model is the simplest system exhibiting a continuous phase transition with a scalar order parameter and  symmetry. The critical exponents of the transition are universal values and characterize the singular properties of physical quantities. The ferromagnetic transition of the Ising model establishes an important universality class, which contains a variety of phase transitions as different as ferromagnetism close to the Curie point and critical opalescence of liquid near its critical point.

From the quantum field theory point of view, the critical exponents can be expressed in terms of scaling dimensions of the local operators  of the conformal field theory describing the phase transition (In the Ginzburg–Landau description, these are the operators normally called .) These expressions are given in the last column of the above table, and were used to calculate the values of the critical exponents using the operator dimensions values from the following table: 

In d=2, the two-dimensional critical Ising model's critical exponents can be computed exactly using the minimal model . In d=4, it is the free massless scalar theory (also referred to as mean field theory). These two theories are exactly solved, and the exact solutions give values reported in the table.

The d=3 theory is not yet exactly solved. This theory has been traditionally studied by the renormalization group methods and Monte-Carlo simulations. The estimates following from those techniques, as well as references to the original works, can be found in Refs. and.

More recently, a conformal field theory method known as the conformal bootstrap has been applied to the d=3 theory. This method gives results in agreement with the older techniques, but up to two orders of magnitude more precise. These are the values reported in the table.

See also 

 Universality class
 XY model

References

Books 
 Kleinert, H. and Schulte-Frohlinde, V.; Critical Properties of φ4-Theories, World Scientific (Singapore, 2001); Paperback  (also available online) (together with V. Schulte-Frohlinde)

External links 
A discussion of critical exponents in general at the Statistical Mechanics Wiki

Critical exponents (phase transitions)